is the thirteenth and final studio album by Japanese pop band Pizzicato Five. The album was released on January 1, 2001 by Readymade Records. Like many of the band's later albums, Çà et là du Japon is set in a famous city of the world during a specific time of the year, in this case Tokyo in winter. Çà et là du Japon differs from other Pizzicato Five albums in that it features several guest vocalists and songwriters, and lead vocalist Maki Nomiya appears on only a few of its songs.

Çà et là du Japon was reissued on March 31, 2006.

Track listing

Notes

Personnel
Additional musicians
 Takashi Nagazumi – vocals on "1 Janvier"
 Shigeru Matsuzaki – vocals on "Nonstop to Tokyo" and "À Tokyo"
 Izumi Yukimura – vocals on "Sakura Sakura" and "In America"
 Masumi Arichika – vocals on "Kimono"
 Sparks – vocals on "Kimono"
 Scott Addison – vocals on "Fashion People"
 Ben Human – vocals on "Fashion People"
 Duke Aces – vocals on "In America"
 Imakuni? – vocals on "Gatta Call'em All!"
 Raymond Johnson – vocals on "Gatta Call'em All!"
 Hiroko Ohashi – vocals on "Gatta Call'em All!"
 Pokémon Kids – vocals on "Gatta Call'em All!"
 Yossie – vocals on "Gatta Call'em All!"
 Rocketman – vocals on "24 Decembre"
 Ronnie – vocals on "24 Decembre"
 Ken Yokoyama – vocals on "Sukiyaki Song"
 You the Rock – vocals on "À Tokyo"
 Bertrand Burgalat – vocals on "Çà et là"
 Clémentine – vocals on "Aiueo"

Charts

References

External links
 

2001 albums
Pizzicato Five albums
Nippon Columbia albums
Japanese-language albums